Gabasawa is a Local Government Area in Kano State, Nigeria. Its headquarters are in the town of Zakirai.

It has an area of 605 km and a population of 211,055 at the 2006 census.

The postal code of the area is 702.

References

Local Government Areas in Kano State